The transformer effect, or mutual induction, is one of the processes by which an electromotive force (e.m.f.) is induced. In a transformer, a changing electric current in a primary coil creates a changing magnetic field that induces a current in a secondary coil.

This process is one of two ways of inducing an electromotive force, the other being the relative motion of a current-carrying conductor within a magnetic field. This method relies on a conductor and magnetic field moving relative to one another, leading to a rate of change of flux, dΦ/dt. This can be explained further by Faraday's law of electromagnetic induction and refined by Lenz's Law.

Electrodynamics